Gherardo Perini was a model for Michelangelo and came to work for him around 1520. When Perini failed to show up to his studio, Michelangelo was distraught and stated "I beg you not to make me draw this evening since Perino's not here." On that same page, he drew a naked putto urinating into a vase.

References in Michelangelo's poetry
Perini was mentioned in Michelangelo's poem G.36. In first line of the poem, Michelangelo states that "Over here it was that my love stole from me." In the third line of the poem it says: "Here with his beautiful eyes he promised me help." This is in reference to Michelangelo expecting him to love him back. In the fourth line he further states "he stole it back." This is Michelangelo lamenting the loss of Perini as his lover. Furthermore, Michelangelo was so captivated by him, that in the first line of the second quatrain he states "he bound me and here released me" and follows in the next line stating "For myself I wept here, and with infinite sorrow" and finally stating in the final line "He who stole myself from me and never turned back." Sonnet 36, left unfinished, sums up the relationship between Michelangelo and Perini. It is a standard set of antitheses commonly used to define the ultimately unsatisfactory completion of a love.

Perini was again mentioned in the poem G.55. It is Michelangelo again states that he is heartbroken that Perini has left him and also adds that he is crazy for Perini.
The poem states "I have bought you, at no small cost, A little something that smells sweet, Since by a scent one often knows a street, Wherever I am, where you may be, I can be clear and certain, free of doubt. If you hide from me, I'll pardon you, For, carrying this, always, as you pass, Even if I were blind, I would find you.

In this poem, Michelangelo is being playful with Perini and making fun of him in such a way that he is telling him that he has given him a very expensive gift and he wants Perini to wear it. Nevertherless, Michelangelo is so attached to Perini, that he will be able to find Perini anywhere.

References

Michelangelo
Italian male models
Year of death unknown
Year of birth unknown
LGBT Roman Catholics